Aushev may refer to:

 Ruslan Aushev
 Bashir Aushev
 Apti Aushev
 Rashid Aushev Central Stadium
 Maksharip Aushev (1966–2009)